The PHP serialization format is the serialization format used by the PHP programming language. The format can serialize PHP's primitive and compound types, and also properly serializes references. The format was first introduced in PHP 4.

In addition to PHP, the format is also used by some third-party applications that are often integrated with PHP applications, for example by Lucene/Solr.

Syntax 

The syntax generally follows the pattern of one-letter code of the variable type, followed by a colon, followed by the variable value, followed by a semicolon.

References

External links 

 PHP: serialize

PHP
Data serialization formats